The Marshall ministry was the 73rd ministry (cabinet) of the Government of South Australia, led by Steven Marshall of the South Australian Liberal Party. It was formed after the 2018 state election and ended after the 2022 state election. It was preceded by the Weatherill ministry and was succeeded by the Malinauskas ministry.

The ministry was made up of 14 members of the Liberal Party.

First formation
The first formation was sworn in by the Governor of South Australia on 19 March 2018. With the Liberals' victory beyond doubt even though counting was underway, Marshall had himself, Liberal deputy leader Vickie Chapman and Father of the South Australian Parliament Rob Lucas sworn in as an interim three-person government, with himself as Premier and Chapman as Deputy Premier. Marshall held all portfolios except Attorney-General, held by Chapman, and Treasurer, held by Lucas. The full ministry took office on 22 March 2018, when Marshall assigned most of his portfolio to other members of the government.

On 7 March 2019, the title of Minister for Industry and Skills was renamed Minister for Innovation and Skills. On 13 January 2020, the tourism portfolio was removed from the trade, tourism and investment portfolios and absorbed into the Premier's portfolio.

On 26 July 2020, Transport Minister Stephan Knoll, Primary Industries Minister Tim Whetstone and Trade Minister David Ridgway resigned from the ministry amid an expenses scandal.

Assistant Ministers 

 Hon. Carolyn Power MP, Assistant Minister for Domestic and Family Violence Prevention
 Hon. Jing Lee MLC, Assistant Minister to the Premier

Notable changes
The post of Minister for the Arts ceased to exist, Arts South Australia was dismantled and its functions transferred to direct oversight by the Department of the Premier and Cabinet.

Second formation 
On 28 July 2020, Marshall announced his new Ministry which was sworn in on 29 July. Changes included the elevation of first term MPs David Basham and Stephen Patterson. House of Assembly Speaker Vincent Tarzia will also move to the Cabinet. Accordingly, a new Speaker will be chosen by the House of Assembly when it returns from the Winter recess in September 2020. Deputy Premier Vickie Chapman takes on the role of Minister for Planning and Local Government, and Corey Wingard becomes the Minister for Infrastructure and Transport.  

Treasurer Rob Lucas retained his position as Leader of Government Business in the Legislative Council, and Dan van Holst Pellekaan was appointed as Leader of Government Business in the House of Assembly.

Assistant Ministers 
 Hon. Carolyn Power MP, Assistant Minister for Domestic and Family Violence Prevention
 Hon. Jing Lee MLC, Assistant Minister to the Premier

Third formation
Vickie Chapman announced her resignation as Deputy Premier and Minister of Planning and Local Government on 22 November 2021 following a successful vote of non-confidence in Parliament against her as Deputy Premier. She officially remained as Attorney-General and in cabinet but stepped down from the roles. Dan van Holst Pellekaan was elected as deputy party leader and sworn in as Deputy Premier the following day. Former Speaker Josh Teague was sworn in as Attorney-General and Minister for Planning and Local Government, with the Attorney-General role intended to be acting only.

Assistant Ministers 
 Hon. Carolyn Power MP, Assistant Minister for Domestic and Family Violence Prevention
 Hon. Jing Lee MLC, Assistant Minister to the Premier

References

South Australian ministries
2018 establishments in Australia